"Love the Island" is the debut single of Japanese singer Ami Suzuki released on July 1, 1998 through True Kiss Disc, sub-label of Sony Music Entertainment Japan owned by Tetsuya Komuro.

Information
"Love the Island" was used in TV commercials for Japanese tourism in Guam. Ami starred those commercials. The single debuted at number 5 in the Oricon Weekly Charts, selling 288,000 copies.

This was the first and only single of Ami Suzuki to be released in a mini CD single format.

Following her blacklisting from the music industry in September 2000, production and distribution of the single stopped in its entirety.

On July 27, 2011, a newly recorded version was released online, and was later included in the greatest hits compilation Ami Selection.

Track listing

Personnel
 Producer - Tetsuya Komuro
 Strings arrangement - Randy Waldman
 Mixing - Keith Cohen (#1), John Van Nest (#2)

Charts
Oricon Sales Chart (Japan)

1998 debut singles
1998 songs
Ami Suzuki songs